Adam Pearlman may refer to:

 Adam Pearlman (soccer) (born 2005), South African-Canadian soccer player
 Adam Yahiye Gadahn (1978-2015), born Adam Pearlman, a former American-born al-Qaeda operative